Scymnus (Pullus) victoris, is a species of lady beetle found in India, Nicobare Islands, Himalayas, Sri Lanka, and Philippines.

Three subspecies identified.

 Scymnus victoris unimaculata Korschefsky, 1934
 Scymnus victoris uninotata (Gorham, 1894)
 Scymnus victoris victoris Motschoulsky, 1858

References

Coccinellidae
Insects of Sri Lanka
Beetles described in 1858